Madisonville is a city in and the county seat of Monroe County, Tennessee, United States. The population was 4,577 at the 2010 census and 5,132 at the 2020 census.

Geography
Madisonville is located at  (35.520691, -84.362905). It is situated along U.S. Route 411 just east of its junction with State Route 68, near the center of Monroe County. The Unicoi Mountains rise prominently to the southeast.

Demographics

2020 census

As of the 2020 United States census, there were 5,132 people, 1,969 households, and 1,131 families residing in the city.

2000 census
As of the census of 2000, there were 3,939 people, 1,671 households, and 1,066 families residing in the town. The population density was 677.4 people per square mile (261.3/km2). There were 1,806 housing units at an average density of 310.6 per square mile (119.8/km2). The racial makeup of the town was 93.42% White, 3.96% African American, 0.25% Native American, 0.33% Asian, 0.13% Pacific Islander, 0.79% from other races, and 1.12% from two or more races. Hispanic or Latino of any race were 2.01% of the population.

There were 1,671 households, out of which 27.6% had children under the age of 18 living with them, 46.4% were married couples living together, 13.8% had a female householder with no husband present, and 36.2% were non-families. 32.0% of all households were made up of individuals, and 12.9% had someone living alone who was 65 years of age or older. The average household size was 2.26 and the average family size was 2.86.

In the town the population was spread out, with 23.0% under the age of 18, 9.6% from 18 to 24, 27.6% from 25 to 44, 22.6% from 45 to 64, and 17.2% who were 65 years of age or older. The median age was 36 years. For every 100 females, there were 89.7 males. For every 100 females age 18 and over, there were 85.6 males.

The median income for a household in the town was $29,250, and the median income for a family was $31,918. Males had a median income of $31,504 versus $23,828 for females. The per capita income for the town was $16,468. About 13.3% of families and 18.8% of the population were below the poverty line, including 26.8% of those under age 18 and 14.0% of those age 65 or over.

History
The City of Madisonville originally began as the town of Tellico, and prior to that a Cherokee village of the same name. The Calhoun Treaty and resulting Hiwassee Purchase of 1819 opened the area for white settlement. Madisonville was founded in the early 1820s as a county seat for Monroe County, which had been formed in 1819.  The town was initially known as "Tellico," but its name was changed to "Madisonville" in 1830 in honor of U.S. President James Madison in accordance with a petition from the residents presented by state representative James Madison Greenway. Madisonville was incorporated on May 16, 1850.

Airport
The Monroe County Airport is a county-owned, public-use airport located two nautical miles (3.7 km) northwest of the central business district of Madisonville.

Education
Hiwassee College, now closed, is located just north of the Madisonville city limits. Madisonville is also home to a satellite campus of Cleveland State Community College.

The Monroe County Schools System serves Madisonville. The schools include: 
Madisonville Primary School
Madisonville Intermediate School
Madisonville Middle School
Sequoyah High School

Sequoyah was formed by the consolidation of Vonore High School and Madisonville High School in 1995.

Notable people
 Isaac Cline - meteorologist, born nearby
 Sue K. Hicks - Scopes Trial attorney and influence for the ballad, "A Boy Named Sue"
 Estes Kefauver - U.S. Congressman and Senator who ran for Vice President as Adlai Stevenson's running mate in 1956
 Sharon Gail Lee - Tennessee Supreme Court Justice
 Tod Sloan - Major League Baseball outfielder
 EmiSunshine - singer/songwriter

References

External links
 Official website

Cities in Monroe County, Tennessee
Cities in Tennessee
County seats in Tennessee
Populated places established in 1822
1822 establishments in Tennessee